James Earl Jones is an American actor known for his appearances on stage and screen.

Jones is known as one of the few entertainers to have won the EGOT (Emmy, Grammy, Oscar, Tony). Jones has received two Primetime Emmy Award nominations, a Grammy Award and three Tony Awards. While Jones has yet to win a competitive Oscar, Jones did receive the Honorary Academy Award in 2011. The award was presented to him by Sir Ben Kingsley. Jones gained worldwide recognition for his vocal performance as Darth Vader in the George Lucas space opera Star Wars films and for Mufasa in the Walt Disney animated film The Lion King (1994). Jones is known for his performances in films such as the political satire Dr. Strangelove (1964), the drama The Great White Hope (1970), the romance Claudine (1974), the drama Matewan (1987), the comedy Coming to America (1988), the sports drama Field of Dreams (1989), the spy thriller The Hunt for Red October (1990), and the drama Cry, the Beloved Country (1995).

Jones received his first Oscar nomination for Best Actor in 1969 for The Great White Hope. For his work in the theatre, he received four competitive Tony Award nominations for Best Actor in a Play winning twice for his performances as Jack Jefferson in The Great White Hope in 1969 and as Troy Maxson in August Wilson's Fences in 1987. In 2017 he received a Special Tony Award at the 71st Tony Awards for his Lifetime achievement in the theatre. For his work in television he received eight Primetime Emmy Award nominations winning twice for Outstanding Supporting Actor in a Limited Series or Movie for Heat Wave and for Outstanding Lead Actor in a Drama Series for Gabriel's Fire in 1991. He also has been nominated for three Grammy Awards winning in 1977 for Best Spoken Word Album for Great American Documents. In 2009, he received the Screen Actors Guild Life Achievement Award.

Major awards

Academy Awards

Tony Awards

Emmy Awards

Grammy Awards

Industry awards

Golden Globe Awards

Screen Actors Guild Awards

Independent Spirit Award

References 

Lists of awards received by American actor